The Beneš decrees were a series of laws drafted by the Czechoslovak government-in-exile in the absence of the Czechoslovak parliament during the German occupation of Czechoslovakia in World War II. They were issued by President Edvard Beneš from 21 July 1940 to 27 October 1945 and retroactively ratified by the Interim National Assembly of Czechoslovakia on 6 March 1946.

The decrees dealt with various aspects of the restoration of Czechoslovakia and its legal system, denazification, and reconstruction of the country. In journalism and political history, the term "Beneš decrees" refer to the decrees of the president and the ordinances of the Slovak National Council (SNR) concerning the status of ethnic Germans, Hungarians and others in postwar Czechoslovakia and represented Czechoslovakia's legal framework for the expulsion of Germans from Czechoslovakia. It was based on the international Potsdam agreement.

As a result, almost all ethnic Germans and Hungarians some of whom had ancestors who had lived in Czechoslovakia for centuries prior to World War II or those who had settled there during the German occupation of Czechoslovakia lost their Czechoslovakian citizenship and property and were expelled from their homes. Some of them died during the expulsion process which took place during the late 1940s. The Beneš decrees were enforced differently in different parts of the country with some decrees being valid only in Bohemia and Moravia, while the ordinances of SNR were enforced in Slovakia.

The decrees remain politically controversial in both the Czech Republic and Slovakia, and modern Germany. They were never repealed and are still used to confiscate property from Hungarians in Slovakia on the grounds that their ancestors should have lost their property.

Historical overview 

Beneš, who was elected president of Czechoslovakia in 1935, resigned after the Munich Agreement in 1938. After the occupation of Czechoslovakia Beneš and other Czechoslovak politicians and officials emigrated to France, establishing the Czechoslovak National Committee, in November 1939, to restore Czechoslovakia. The committee's primary task was to establish a Czechoslovak army in France. After the fall of France the committee moved to London, where it became the Interim Czechoslovak Government. The government was recognized as the interim Czechoslovak government by Great Britain on 21 July 1940 and in 1941 it was fully recognized by the U.S. and the USSR as the government of the allied state. Since its recognition in 1940, the government issued the decrees to rule over Czechoslovak citizens abroad.

Beneš and other Czechoslovak politicians blamed the national minorities (Hungarians and Germans) for the collapse of Czechoslovakia, which was why they wanted to create an ethnically homogeneous nation-state.

Legality and legitimacy 
According to the Czechoslovak constitution of 1920, the only body with power to issue the laws was the National Assembly (parliament) with each law being contrasigned by the president. As there was no way to summon the parliament in the exile, the only body with limited legislative power was the office of the president. The legality of the whole government-in-exile was therefore derived from the person of Edvard Beneš who, nevertheless, resigned his office in October 1938.

Beneš returned to his post as president on the premise that his 1938 resignation under duress was invalid. He then appointed members of the government-in-exile and the State Council. Because his presidential term should have ended in 1942, the government adopted a resolution that Beneš would remain president until new elections could be held.

Although Beneš alone issued Decree No. 1/1940 (on the establishment of the government), all later decrees were proposed by the government in exile according to the 1920 Czechoslovak constitution and co-signed by the prime minister or a delegated minister. The decrees' validity was subject to later ratification by the National Assembly.
Beginning on September 1, 1944 (after the Slovak National Uprising) the Slovak National Council (SNR) held legislative and executive power in Slovakia, later differentiating between statewide acts and other regulations; presidential decrees were valid in Slovakia only if they explicitly mentioned agreement by the SNR.

On 4 April 1945 a new government was created in Košice, Slovakia (recently liberated by the Red Army), consisting of parties united in the National Front and strongly influenced by the Communist Party of Czechoslovakia. The president's power to enact decrees (as proposed by the government) remained in force until 27 October 1945, when the Interim National Assembly convened.

Types of decrees 
The decrees may be divided as follows:

Although decrees were not covered by the 1920 constitution, they were considered necessary by the Czechoslovak wartime and postwar authorities. On ratification by the Interim National Assembly, they became binding laws with retroactive validity and attempted to preserve Czechoslovak legal order during the occupation. Most of the decrees were abolished by later legislation (see the list below) or became obsolete by having served their purpose.

List of decrees 

Note: This list includes only decrees published in the official Collection of Laws of Czechoslovakia after the liberation in 1945. Other (not re-published) decrees were ineffective in the liberated Czechoslovakia already in 1945.

Loss of citizenship and confiscation of property

Legal basis for expulsions 

The Beneš decrees are associated with the 1945–47 deportation of about 3 million ethnic Germans and Hungarians from Czechoslovakia. The deportation, based on Article 12 of the Potsdam Agreement, was the outcome of negotiations between the Allied Control Council and the Czechoslovak government. The expulsion is considered ethnic cleansing (a term in widespread use since the early 1990s) by a number of historians and legal scholars. The relevant decrees omit any reference to the deportation.

Of the allies, the Soviet Union urged the United Kingdom and the U.S. to agree to the transfer of ethnic Germans and German-speaking Poles, Czechs, Hungarians, Yugoslavs and Romanians into their zones of occupation. France, which was not a party to the Potsdam Agreement, did not accept exiles in its zone of occupation after July 1945. Most ethnic-German Czechoslovak citizens had supported the Nazis through the Sudeten German Party (led by Konrad Henlein) and the 1938 German annexation of the Sudetenland. Most ethnic Germans of the Sudetenland, many of whom had wished their region to stay as part of Austria in 1919, failed to follow the mobilization order when Czechoslovakia was threatened with war by Hitler in 1938, crippling the army's defensive capabilities .

Decree subjects 

In general, the decrees dealt with loss of citizenship and confiscation of the property of:
 Art 1(1): Germany and Hungary, or companies incorporated in Germany or Hungary and selected entities (e.g. NSDAP)
 Art 1(2): Those who applied for German or Hungarian citizenship during the occupation and specified German or Hungarian ethnicity in the 1929 census
 Art 1(3): Those who acted against the sovereignty, independence, integrity, democratic and republican organization, safety and defense of the Czechoslovak Republic, incited such acts or intentionally supported the German or Hungarian occupiers (Polish occupiers were omitted)

The defining character in definition of the entities affected was their hostility to the Czechoslovak Republic and to the Czech and Slovak nations. The hostility presumption was irrebuttable in case of entities in the Art.1(1), while it is rebuttable under Art.1(2) in case of physical persons of German or Hungarian ethnicity, i.e. that they were exempted under Decrees 33 (loss of citizenship), 100 (nationalization of large enterprises without remuneration) and 108 (expropriation) where they proved that they remained loyal to the Czechoslovak Republic, they had not committed an offense against the Czech and Slovak nation, and that they had either actively participated in the liberation of Czechoslovakia or were subjected to Nazi or fascist terror. At the same time, Art 1(3) covered any persons notwithstanding ethnicity, including Czechs and Slovaks.

Some 250,000 Germans, some anti-fascists exempted under the Decrees and others considered crucial to industry , remained in Czechoslovakia. Many ethnic German anti-fascists emigrated under an agreement drawn up by Alois Ullmann. 

Some of those affected held land settled by their ancestors since their invitation by the Bohemian king Otokar II during the 13th century or the Hungarian conquest of the Carpathian Basin at the turn of the ninth and tenth centuries.

Regaining Czechoslovak citizenship 

Loss of Czechoslovak citizenship was addressed in Decree 33 (see description above). Under article three of the decree, those who lost their citizenship could request its restoration within six months of the decree's promulgation and requests would be assessed by the Interior Ministry.

On 13 April 1948 the Czechoslovak government issued Regulation 76/1948 Coll., lengthening the window for requesting reinstatement of Czechoslovak citizenship under Decree 33 to three years. Under this regulation, the Interior Ministry was bound to restore an applicant's citizenship unless it could determine that they had breached the "duties of a Czechoslovak citizen"; the applicant may have been requested also to prove "adequate" knowledge of Czech or Slovak language.

On 25 October 1948 Act 245/1948 Coll. was adopted, in which ethnic Hungarians who were Czechoslovak citizens on 1 November 1938 and lived in Czechoslovakia at the time of the act's promulgation could regain Czechoslovak citizenship if they pledged allegiance to the Republic within 90 days. Taking the oath would, according to German laws valid at the time in 1948, automatically lead to loss of German citizenship.

On 13 July 1949, Act 194/1949 Coll. was adopted. Under article three of the act, the Interior Ministry could bestow citizenship on applicants who had not committed an offence against Czechoslovakia or the people's democracy, had lived in the country for at least five years, and who would lose their other citizenship by receiving the Czechoslovak one.

On 24 April 1953, Act 34/1953 Coll. was adopted. Under this act, ethnic Germans who lost Czechoslovak citizenship under Decree 33 and were living in Czechoslovakia on the day of the act's promulgation automatically regained their citizenship. This also applied to spouses and children living in Czechoslovakia with no other citizenship.

For comparison, any person may currently be granted Czech citizenship if they:
Have been granted long-term residence and have been living in the country for at least five years, and
Have not been found guilty of a criminal offense in the past five years, and
Demonstrate knowledge of the Czech language, and
Fulfill the legal requirements of the Czech Republic, such as paying taxes and obtaining health insurance

Restitution of property 
After the Velvet Revolution Act 243/1992 Coll. was adopted, arranging restitution of real estate taken by the decrees or lost during the occupation. The act applied to:
Citizens of the Czech Republic (or their descendants) who:
Lost their property after the communist coup of 25 February 1948 (loss of title to the property was entered into the land registry after this date) on the basis of decrees 12 (confiscation of agricultural property) or 108 (general confiscation), and
Regained Czechoslovak citizenship under Decree 33 or Acts 245/1948, 194/1949 or 34/1953 Coll. and had not lost their citizenship by 1 January 1990, and
Had not committed an offense against Czechoslovakia.
Claims could be made until 31 December 1992 by those living in the Czech Republic and until 15 July 1996 by those living abroad.
Citizens of the Czech Republic (or their descendants) who lost their property during the occupation, were entitled to its restitution under decrees 5 and 128 and had not been compensated (e.g. Jews); claims could be made until 30 June 2001.

Current status

United Nations

International Covenant on Civil and Political Rights
In 2010 the United Nations Human Rights Committee, under the Optional Protocol to the International Covenant on Civil and Political Rights, reviewed a communication submitted by Josef Bergauer et al. The committee held that the covenant became effective in 1975 and its protocol in 1991. Since the covenant could not be applied retroactively, the committee held that the communication was inadmissible.

Restitution legislation
After the Velvet Revolution Czechoslovakia also adopted Act 87/1991 Coll., providing restitution or compensation to victims of confiscation for political reasons during the Communist regime (25 February 1948 – 1 January 1990). The law also provided for restitution or compensation to victims of racial persecution during World War II who are entitled by Decree 5/1945.

In 2002 the UN Human Rights Committee stated its views in Brokova v. The Czech Republic, in which the applicant was refused restitution of property nationalized under Decree 100 (nationalization of large enterprises). Brokova was excluded from restitution, although the Czech nationalization in 1946–47 could be implemented only because the author's property had been confiscated during the German occupation. In the committee's view, this was discriminatory treatment of the plaintiff compared to those whose property was confiscated by Nazi authorities and not nationalized immediately after the war (and who, therefore, could benefit from the laws of 1991 and 1994). The committee found that Brokova was denied her right to equal protection under the law, in violation of article 26 of the International Covenant on Civil and Political Rights.

European Court of Human Rights
In 2005, the European Court of Human Rights refused the application of Josef Bergauer and 89 others against the Czech Republic. According to the applicants, "after the Second World War, they were expelled from their homeland in genocidal circumstances", their property was confiscated by Czechoslovak authorities, the Czech Republic failed to suspend the Beneš Decrees and had not compensated them. The court held that the expropriation took place long before the implementation of the European Convention on Human Rights with respect to the Czech Republic. Since Article 1 of Protocol 1 does not guarantee the right to acquire property, although the Beneš Decrees remained part of Czech law the applicants had no claim under the convention against the Czech Republic to recover the confiscated property. According to the court, "it should be further noted that the case-law of the Czech courts made the restitution of property available even to persons expropriated contrary to the Presidential Decrees, thus providing for the reparation of acts which contravened the law then in force. The Czech judiciary thus provides protection extending beyond the standards of the Convention."

Czech Republic

Review by the Czech Constitutional Court

Validity of the decrees 
The validity of the Beneš decrees was first reviewed at the plenary session of the Czech Constitutional Court in its decisions of 8 March 1995, published as Decisions No. 5/1995 Coll. and 14/1995 Coll. The court addressed the following issues concerning the decrees' validity: The conformity of the decree process with the Czechoslovak law and the 1920 Constitution; Beneš' right to issue the decrees, despite the existence of a formal protectorate government and German occupation decrees appropriate for the time of their issuance, in accordance with international consensus; decrees using the principle of responsibility, rather than guilt;
 decrees targeting those hostile to the republic, not an ethnic group in general; decrees meeting the proportionality test;
 In Decision 14/1995 Coll. the court held that the decree at issue was legitimate. It found that since the decree has fulfilled its purpose and has not produced legal effects for more than four decades, it may not be reviewed by the court for its adherence to the 1992 Czech constitution. In the court's view, such a review would lack legal purpose and cast doubt on the principle of legal certainty (an essential principle of democracies adhering to the rule of law).

Confiscation formalities 
Although under Decrees 12 and 108 confiscations were automatic on the basis of the decrees themselves, Decree 100 (nationalization of large enterprises) required a formal decision by the Minister of Industry. According to the Constitutional Court, if a Decree 100 nationalization decision was made by someone other than the minister the nationalization was invalid and subject to legal challenge.

Abuses 
While hearing appeals of court decisions dealing with Decree 12 confiscations, the Constitutional Court held that courts must decide whether a confiscation decision was motivated by persecution and a decree used as a pretext. This applied to cases of those who remained in the Sudetenland after the Munich Agreement (gaining German citizenship while remaining loyal to Czechoslovakia) and those convicted as traitors whose convictions were later overturned (with their property confiscated in the meantime).

Slovakia

Legal status 
Slovakia, as a legal successor of Czechoslovakia, adopted its legal order by Article 152 of the Slovak constitution. This includes the Beneš decrees and Czechoslovak Constitutional Act 23/1991 (the Charter of Fundamental Human Rights and Freedoms). This act made all acts or regulations not compliant with the charter inoperable. Although the Beneš decrees are a valid historical part of Slovak law, they can no longer create legal relationships and have been ineffective since 31 December 1991.

On 20 September 2007, the Slovak parliament adopted a resolution concerning the untouchability of postwar documents relating to conditions in Slovakia after World War II. The resolution was originally proposed by the ultra-nationalist Slovak National Party in response to the activities of Hungarian members of parliament and organizations in Hungary. The Beneš decrees  were a significant talking point of the Hungarian extremist groups Magyar Gárda and Nemzeti Őrsereg, which became active in August 2007. The approved text differed from the proposal in several important respects. The resolution commemorated the victims of World War II, refused the principle of collective guilt, expressed a desire to stop the reopening of topics related to World War II in the context of European integration and declared a wish to build good relationships with Slovakia's neighbors. It also rejected all attempts at revision and questioning of laws, decrees, agreements or other postwar decisions of Slovak and Czechoslovak bodies which could lead to changes in the postwar order, declaring that postwar decisions are not the basis of current discrimination and cannot establish legal relationships. The resolution was adopted by an absolute parliamentary majority and approved by the coalition government and opposition parties, except for the Party of the Hungarian Coalition. It prompted a strong negative reaction in Hungary, and Hungarian President László Sólyom said that it would strain Hungarian-Slovak relations.

Differences from the Czech Republic 
Politicians and journalists have frequently ignored differences in conditions between Slovakia and the Czech Republic during the postwar era. In Slovakia, some measures incorrectly called "Beneš decrees" were not presidential decrees but ordinances by the Slovak National Council (SNR). The confiscation of the agricultural property of Germans, Hungarians, traitors and enemies of the Slovak nation was not enforced by the Beneš decrees, but by the Ordinance of the SNR  104/1945; punishment of fascist criminals, occupiers, traitors and collaborators was based on the Ordinance of the SNR 33/1945. The Beneš decrees and SNR ordinances sometimes contained different solutions.

The list of decrees which have never been valid in Slovakia contains several with a significant impact on German and Hungarian minorities in the Czech lands:

Apologies for postwar persecution 
In 1990 the speakers of the Slovak and Hungarian parliaments, František Mikloško and György Szabad, agreed on the reassessment of their common relationship by a commission of Slovak and Hungarian historians. Although the initiative was hoped to lead to a common memorandum about the limitation of mutual injustices, it did not have the expected result. On February 12, 1991, the Slovak National Council formally apologized for postwar persecution of innocent Germans, rejecting the principle of collective guilt. In 2003, speaker of the Slovak parliament Pavol Hrušovský said that Slovakia was ready to apologize for postwar injustices if Hungary would do likewise. Although Hungarian National Assembly Speaker Katalin Szili approved his initiative, further steps were not taken. In 2005 Mikloško apologized for injustices on his own, and similar unofficial apologies were made by representatives of both sides.

Contemporary political effects 

According to Radio Prague, since the decrees which dealt with the status and property of Germans, Hungarians and traitors have not been repealed they still affect political relations between the Czech Republic and Slovakia and Austria, Germany and Hungary. Expellees in the Sudetendeutsche Landsmannschaft (part of the Federation of Expellees) and associated political groups call for the abolition of the Beneš decrees based on the principle of collective guilt.

On 28 December 1989 future Czechoslovak president Václav Havel, at that time a candidate, suggested that former inhabitants of the Sudetenland might apply for Czech nationality to reclaim their lost property. The governments of Germany and the Czech Republic signed a declaration of mutual apology for wartime misdeeds in 1997.

During the early 2000s, Hungarian Prime Minister Viktor Orbán, Austrian Chancellor Wolfgang Schüssel and Bavarian Premier Edmund Stoiber demanded that the Beneš decrees be repealed as a precondition for both countries' entrance to the European Union. Hungarian Prime Minister Péter Medgyessy eventually decided not to press the issue.

In 2003 Liechtenstein, supported by Norway and Iceland, blocked an agreement about extending the European Economic Area because of the Beneš decrees and property disputes with the Czech Republic and (to a lesser extent) Slovakia. However, since the two countries were expected to become members of the European Union the issue was moot. Liechtenstein did not recognize Slovakia until 9 December 2009.

Prime Minister Miloš Zeman said that the Czechs would not consider repealing the decrees because of an underlying fear that doing so would open the door to demands for restitution. According to Time, former Czech foreign minister Jan Kavan said: "Why should we single out the Beneš Decrees? ... They belong to the past and should stay in the past. Many current members of the E.U. had similar laws." In 2009 eurosceptic Czech president Václav Klaus demanded an opt-out of the Charter of Fundamental Rights of the European Union, feeling that the charter would render the Beneš decrees illegal. In 2010, when Masaryk University erected a statue to Edvard Beneš, local journalist Michael Kašparek criticized the move because of what he dubbed "Expel Them All, Let God Sort Them Out!" decrees. In January 2013 conservative Czech presidential candidate Karel Schwarzenberg said, "What we committed in 1945 would today be considered a grave violation of human rights, and the Czechoslovak government, along with President Beneš, would have found themselves in The Hague." His opponent, Miloš Zeman, seized on the statement to discredit Schwarzenberg, accusing him of being supported by Sudeten Germans.

In June 2018, German Chancellor Angela Merkel said there had been "no moral or political justification" for the post-war expulsion of ethnic Germans.

References

External links

1945 documents
Decrees
Sudetenland
Czechoslovak law
Czechoslovakia in World War II
Post–World War II forced migrations
Ethnic cleansing in Europe
Ethnic cleansing of Germans
German diaspora in Europe
Hungarian diaspora
Minority rights
Law of Slovakia
Law of the Czech Republic
Anti-Hungarian sentiment
Anti-German sentiment in Europe
United Nations Human Rights Committee case law
Czech Republic–Germany relations